Salt and pepper are a commonly paired set of condiments for European style cuisine.

Salt and pepper may also refer to:

In entertainment:
Salt and Pepper (album), 1963 album by Paul Gonsalves & Sonny Stitt
Salt and Pepper (film), 1968 film
Salt N' Pepper, 2011 Malayalam film 
Salt-n-Pepa, female American hip hop group

In food:
Salt and pepper shakers, the containers for the two condiments
Salt and pepper catfish
Sichuan pepper salt, i.e. Hua jiao yan (花椒盐), a mixture of Sichuan peppercorns and salt, roasted and ground together to make a condiment used with poultry or pork dishes. 

In science:
 Salt-and-pepper chromatin, in pathology refers to cell nuclei that demonstrate granular chromatin (on light microscopy).
 Salt and pepper noise, a form of noise typically seen on images

Other:
Salt and pepper (superstition), or "bread and butter", a superstitious charm uttered when two walking people are separated
 "Salt and pepper" as a name for a mixture of dark and gray human hair color

See also 
 Pepper and salt (disambiguation)